Wahib is a given name and a surname. It may refer to:

Given name
Wahib al-Ghanim (1919-2003), Syrian physician and politician, a co-founder of the Ba'ath Party
Wahib Wahab (1918-1986), Indonesian religious figure, politician, government minister

Surname
Ahmad Wahib (1942-1973), Indonesian progressive Islamic intellectual
Bilal Wahib (born 1999), Dutch film and TV actor, singer and rapper
Wesam Wahib (born 1992), Saudi Arabian footballer

See also
Abu Waheeb (1986–2016), a leader of the militant group Islamic State in Iraq and the Levant (ISIL) in Anbar, Iraq
Ignatius bar Wahib, Syriac Orthodox Patriarch of Mardin from 1293 until his death in 1333